Y Garn is a subsidiary summit of Pen Pumlumon Fawr and the fourth highest peak on the Plynlimon massif, a part of the Cambrian Mountains in the county of Ceredigion, Wales.

The summit is marked by a large shelter cairn, hollowed out from an ancient burial cairn. The views include Rhos Fawr, Drygarn Fawr, Pen y Garn to the south and Aran Fawddwy, Glasgwm, Tarrenhendre and Tarren y Gesail to the north.
Marilyns.

References

External links
 www.geograph.co.uk ; photos of Plynlimon and surrounding area

Mountains and hills of Ceredigion
Hewitts of Wales
Nuttalls
Elenydd